Kuys Varvara (the Virgin Barbara) is a revered religious figure in parts of Armenia, and the Tsaghkavank (Flower Monastery) is a cave shrine devoted to her on the southern slopes of Mount Ara. The mossy cave is reported to contain a spring, held as sacred by some believers. An altar, ferns, and candle vendors are also around the shrine. Legend holds that Saint Barbara  was martyred by her cruel father for espousing Christianity. She is one of the saints of the Armenian Apostolic Church.

References

External links
Tour page with photos

Armenian saints
Female saints